William Kenneth Moore (December 5, 1925 – March 31, 2016) was a Canadian professional football player who was a guard for the Edmonton Eskimos and Calgary Stampeders of the Canadian Football League (CFL). He also football at the University of Alberta. Moore was later a lawyer and judge in Alberta, serving on the Court of Queen's Bench as an associate justice from 1981 to 1984, and as chief justice from 1984 to 2000. Moore was a member of the board of directors for the Calgary bid committee for the 1988 Winter Olympics.

References

1925 births
2016 deaths
Edmonton Elks players
Players of Canadian football from Alberta
Canadian football people from Calgary